Stephen Anthony McPartland (born 9 August 1976)  is a British Conservative Party politician and business consultant. He was first elected as the Member of Parliament (MP) for Stevenage at the 2010 general election.

On 13 February 2023, he announced his intention to stand down at the next general election.

Early life
Born in Liverpool on 9 August 1976, McPartland read History at the University of Liverpool, graduating in 1997. He studied for an MSc in Technology Management at Liverpool John Moores University in 1998. After graduating in 1999, he worked for the Conservative Party in Warrington, where he managed a range of local council, parliamentary and European election campaigns, before he moved to Hertfordshire in 2001 to work as a Campaign Manager. Prior to being elected as an MP, McPartland was the Director of Membership for British American Business (the US Chamber of Commerce), based in London.

Parliamentary career
McPartland won the parliamentary seat of Stevenage at the 2010 general election, with a swing of 8% after the sitting Labour MP Barbara Follett stood down. He was re-elected at the 2015 general election and 2017 general election.

McPartland's political interests include health care, with a particular focus on cancer treatment and respiratory diseases; education, science and technology, including satellite technology; international trade; policing; addiction treatment; urban regeneration and government procurement of IT projects.

He served on the Science and Technology Select Committee between 2011 and 2012. In 2017 he joined the Finance Select Committee (Commons), was elected Chair of the Regulatory Reform Select Committee and also became a member of the Liaison Select Committee.

He sat on the 2011 Education Bill Committee and participated in all stages of the Bill's passage through Parliament, and was on the Board of the Parliamentary Office of Science and Technology since 2015.
 
Up until his election as a Select Committee Chairman, McPartland was involved with the running of several All Party Parliamentary Groups (APPGs). He was Chair of the Allergy APPG, Child and Youth Crime APPG, Child Health and Vaccine Preventable Diseases APPG, Furniture Industry APPG and Respiratory Health APPG, and Vice Chair of the Disability APPG. As Chair of the Respiratory Health APPG, McPartland led an inquiry into respiratory deaths and noted that the UK has the worst death rate of OECD countries and that most deaths of children from asthma are preventable. He also successfully campaigned to change the law from 1 October 2014 to allow emergency inhalers for asthma attacks to be kept in schools.

McPartland was Parliamentary Private Secretary to the Minister of State for Trade and Investment, Lord Livingston in 2014–15.

McPartland initiated a parliamentary inquiry into electronic invoicing in the public sector; it delivered its findings in June 2014. He has also called for greater interoperability, with the launch of an Interoperability Charter in April 2013, to encourage and recognise best practice in delivering the Digital Economy.

In June 2014, he was criticised after Furniture Village, which employed McPartland as a non-executive director, stated in an advert that its latest sale "should help towards the bedroom tax". The advert was described as 'being in the worst possible taste' and it was suggested McPartland should 'apologise to anyone who has found this to have added to the difficulties they have had with what is already a serious financial issue.' The company responded that the advert would not be used again and that, though no offence was ever intended, they accepted that the wording was misjudged. McPartland declined to comment.

In May 2015, he was criticised for earning over £80,000 per year for consultancy work and as non-executive director of a furniture company. He had pledged at an election debate in 2010 that he believed it was important to have an MP for Stevenage who treats it as a full-time job. 

McPartland campaigned against corporate tax avoidance, including, in 2015, writing to all of the FTSE100 CEOs to ask whether they would be willing to support greater tax transparency.

McPartland has worked closely with Sir Oliver Heald to campaign for Finn's Law, to provide emergency service animals with greater protection after Police Dog Finn was stabbed in Stevenage in 2016.

McPartland has been outspoken on welfare issues and has garnered respect for his knowledge of the technical changes involved, leading the successful campaigns against changes to Tax Credits, improvements to Universal Credit  and protecting the self-employed against changes to Employers National Insurance Contributions. He has been an outspoken critic of his own party in Government at times, with particular focus on the benefits system. 

McPartland supported Brexit in the 2016 EU membership referendum.

In December 2017, a BBC investigation, following the Grenfell Tower fire, reported that McPartland had lobbied against tighter regulation on limiting use of flammable material in furniture through his role as chair of the All Party Parliamentary Furniture Industry Group. The investigation argued the group was seen by the furniture industry as a way of lobbying government and that the British Furniture Confederation funded a secretariat to help McPartland run the APPG. It reported that two months after intervening he had been given a place on the board of Furniture Village on a salary of £42,000 a year. McPartland stated that he did not lobby Ministers and was an MP, not a lobbyist. He further said that Furniture Village was a retailer, not a manufacturer and imported products globally.

In the House of Commons he sits on the Finance Committee and the Liaison Committee. He has previously sat on the Science and Technology Committee and the Regulatory Reform Committee until it dissolved in May 2021.

On 7 July 2022, he was appointed Minister of State for Security at the Home Office as part of the caretaker government installed by outgoing Prime Minister Boris Johnson. He was made a privy councillor upon his appointment. He was not reappointed by the incoming Prime Minister Liz Truss and returned to the backbenches.

In January 2023 he was the only Conservative MP to vote against the Government on the Second Reading of the Strikes (Minimum Service Levels) Bill, describing it as "shameful" and an attack on individual Trade Union members.

On 13 February 2023, McPartland announced that would not be seeking reelection at the next general election.

Work for charities
From 2014 until 2015, McPartland served as chairman of The Furniture Ombudsman, a not-for-profit, industry-wide customer disputes resolution body.  McPartland was a Trustee of The Living Room Charity, which offers a wide range of free addiction treatment services and a Patron of the Turn the Tide project. He was a Patron of Trailblazers, a national charity that reduces re-offending among young people through providing volunteer mentors.

Personal life
McPartland lives in Stevenage with his wife, Emma, who is a Special Educational Needs Co-Ordinator (SENCo) at a local primary school.

References

External links
Official website

Campaign for a Radiotherapy Unit at Lister Hospital facebook campaign supported by McPartland

Living people
1976 births
Conservative Party (UK) MPs for English constituencies
UK MPs 2010–2015
UK MPs 2015–2017
UK MPs 2017–2019
UK MPs 2019–present
Members of the Privy Council of the United Kingdom